Osán is a locality located in the municipality of Sabiñánigo, in Huesca province, Aragon, Spain. As of 2020, it has a population of 19.

Geography 
Osán is located 51km north-northeast of Huesca.

References

Populated places in the Province of Huesca